The 2013 Premiership Rugby Sevens Series (styled for sponsorship reasons as the 2013 J.P Morgan Asset Management Premiership Rugby 7s Series) was the fourth Rugby Union 7-a-side competition for the twelve 2013–14 Aviva Premiership Clubs. The group stages were run on 1–3 August 2013 and the final at the Recreation Ground on 9 August 2013.

Format
The twelve Premiership Clubs were split into 3 Groups – A, B and C based upon geographical location – with each group playing on consecutive days at the beginning of August. Each team in the group played each other once, to the International Rugby Board Laws of the Game - 7s Variations. Based on the result, teams received:
4 points for a win
2 points for a draw
1 bonus point for a loss by seven points or less
1 bonus point for scoring four or more tries in a match
Following all the games, the winner and runner up in each group progressed to the Final Stage.  In the final, the 6 teams (3 Winners and 3 Runners up) were split into 2 pools. Again teams played each other once and points were awarded based on the match result. Following the culmination of this stage the winners of each pool progressed to the final, the winner of that game being declared the champions.

Group stage
The group draw was based on geographical location of the clubs playing. Premiership Rugby confirmed the match times on 4 July 2013.

Group A
Played at Kingsholm, Gloucester on Thursday 1 August 2013.  The attendance on the night was nearly 13,000.

Group B
Played at Franklin's Gardens, Northampton on Friday 2 August 2013.  The attendance on the night was 9,432.

Group C
Played at Allianz Park, Barnet, London on Saturday 3 August 2013.

Final stage
The Final Stage was played at The Recreation Ground, Bath on Friday 9 August 2013 in front of a sell out crowd.

For the finals, the 6 qualified teams were split into two pools of three teams.  Scoring was the same as in the previous rounds (4 points for a win, etc.), and the winner of each pool progressed to the final.

Pool A

Pool B

Final
The final was contested by the winners of the two finals pools.  In a slight difference to the rest of the series, the final was played in two halves of 10 minutes (instead of 7 minutes), with a slightly longer half-time.

 Gloucester 7s won the 2013 Premiership Rugby Sevens Series and with it qualification to the inaugural World Club 7s at Twickenham.

Broadcasting
The competition, including the final, will be broadcast live on the new BT Sport channel.  The channel launched on Thursday 1 August, the first day of the competition.
Highlights of the 2013 competition were shown on STV in Scotland.

References

Premiership Rugby Sevens Series
Sevens
English Premiership